The Way of the Spirit is a 1906 novel by H. Rider Haggard.

References

External links
Complete book at Free Read

Novels by H. Rider Haggard
1906 British novels
1906 fantasy novels